Speranski Australia is a brand of handcrafted mandolins.

Known models are: Speranski Australia F-Style Mandolin (SF, SFB, SPB and Custom models) and Speranski Australia A-Style Mandolin (no longer produced).

Tilia (also known as basswood or linden) composite materials used for making top decks in SF models instead of spruce ply used by most other manufacturers.

Solid carved spruce is used for top decks in SPB, SFB and Custom models.

Speranski mandolins have rich sound that tends to get better over the years.

References

External links
 

Companies based in Canberra
Australian companies established in 1999
Musical instrument manufacturing companies of Australia
Australian brands
Guitar manufacturing companies